This is a list of rivers in Malawi. This list is arranged by drainage basin, with respective tributaries indented under each larger stream's name.

Indian Ocean
Ruvuma River (Mozambique)
Lugenda River (Mozambique)
Luchimua River
Mandimbe River
Ngalamu River
Zambezi River (Mozambique)
Shire River
Ruo River
Thuchila River
Luchenza River
Likabula River
Namkurumadzi River
Lisungwe River
Rivi Rivi River
Liwawadzi River
Masanje River
Lake Malawi
Bwanje River
Lilongwe River
Diampwe River
Likuni River
Bua River
Dwangwa River
Luweya River
South Rukuru River
Kasitu River
Rumpi River
North Rukuru River
Lufilya River
Mbalizi River
Songwe River

Lake Chilwa
Sombani River
Phalombe River

References
United Nations 2004
GEOnet Names Server

Malawi
Rivers